Simon James may refer to:
 Simon James (academic), English academic
 Simon James (archaeologist), British archaeologist
 Simon James (musician) (born 1954), of Acoustic Alchemy
 Simon James,  UK radio presenter, see Simon James and Hill
 Simon Porritt, Australian CEO, acted under the name Simon James
 Simon R.H. James, author of London Film Location Guide

See also

James Simon (disambiguation)